Alberto Urdiales Márquez (born 17 November 1968 in Santander, Cantabria) is a Spanish handball player. He competed in the 1992, 1996, and 2000 Olympics.

In 1992, he was a member of the Spanish handball team which finished fifth in the Olympic tournament. He played four matches and scored 30 goals.

Four years later he won the bronze medal with the Spanish team in the 1996 Olympics. He played all seven matches and scored 31 goals.

At the 2000 Games, he won his second Olympic bronze medal as part of the Spanish team. He played three matches and scored one goal.

References
 

1968 births
Living people
Spanish male handball players
Handball players from Cantabria
Olympic handball players of Spain
Handball players at the 1992 Summer Olympics
Handball players at the 1996 Summer Olympics
Handball players at the 2000 Summer Olympics
Olympic bronze medalists for Spain
SDC San Antonio players
Olympic medalists in handball
Medalists at the 2000 Summer Olympics
Medalists at the 1996 Summer Olympics